Phantom Thread (Original Motion Picture Soundtrack) is the original soundtrack album to the 2017 film Phantom Thread, directed by Paul Thomas Anderson and starring Daniel Day-Lewis. The record consists of eighteen tracks from a film score written and composed by Jonny Greenwood. Greenwood's score was released digitally by Nonesuch Records on 12 January 2018, with a CD edition later released on 9 February 2018 and a vinyl edition on 21 April 2018. In preparation for the score, Greenwood researched the musical trends of the 1950s, referencing Glenn Gould's Bach recordings and the work of Nelson Riddle. The score was recorded in London with a 60-piece orchestra, including the Royal Philharmonic Orchestra and the London Contemporary Orchestra. It is Greenwood's fourth soundtrack for director Paul Thomas Anderson and appears across the majority of the film's 130-minute runtime. It was met with favourable reviews from critics, receiving nominations for the Academy Award for Best Original Score, the Golden Globe Award for Best Original Score and the BAFTA Award for Best Original Music.

Background and recording 
Phantom Thread is a historical drama set in 1950s London and is about the fictional couturier Reynolds Woodcock, played by Daniel Day-Lewis. The soundtrack was composed by Jonny Greenwood and consists of piano and string sections. Director Paul Thomas Anderson initially asked Greenwood for an "English" sound, but they found the folk-influenced orchestral music typical of Britain in the 1950s to be too "twee" for a London fashion designer like Reynolds Woodcock. Greenwood specifically researched music that was written and recorded during the 1950s as well as the classical music which was popular with that generation. The works of Nelson Riddle and Glenn Gould's Bach recordings were Greenwood's primary references. In particular, Anderson advised Greenwood to research Riddle's score for Stanley Kubrick's Lolita (1962) and his work with jazz pianist Oscar Peterson. Anderson also advised Greenwood to view David Lean's 1949 film The Passionate Friends, which was scored by Richard Addinsell. The music of jazz pianist Bill Evans was also an inspiration for Greenwood.

Greenwood's score was written during his travels for Radiohead's A Moon Shaped Pool tour, including in hotel rooms and dressing rooms. His recording process first involved recording demos through his iPhone and sending them to Anderson. The first two pieces he sent were deemed too dark by Anderson, who felt the music was "giving away what's going to happen" in the story. Anderson pushed Greenwood for a more romantic sound, and was interested in incorporating large string sections. Greenwood was inspired by the large, "over-the-top" romantic orchestra recordings of baroque composers Bach and Vivaldi from the 1960s and 1970s, including Riccardo Muti's 1977 recording of Vivaldi's "Gloria". He was also inspired by string-heavy jazz records from the 1950s, including Ben Webster's Music for Loving (1954). Greenwood envisioned what music the characters themselves would have listened to, and convinced Anderson that the character of Woodcock would intensely listen to Glenn Gould. Principally, Greenwood focused on composing "genuinely romantic music" that was sincere and not "pastiche" or "overly atonal/microtonal". At the same time, he worked to ensure the music was keeping with the 1950s while avoiding any sense of being "tongue-in-cheek" or "ironic", which Greenwood believed was antithetical to the character of Reynolds Woodcock. The piano served as the common ground between the contrasting romantic compositions for the film and the more formal music fitting for Reynolds Woodcock. Greenwood also received musical input from Day-Lewis, who discussed the music of Thomas Tallis.

The album was recorded in London at RAK Studios and AIR Studios. It was recorded with the Royal Philharmonic Orchestra, conducted by Robert Ziegler, and the London Contemporary Orchestra, conducted by Robert Ames. Greenwood also enlisted a string quartet, which appears on four of the album's tracks. At one point, Greenwood recorded with an orchestra of 60 strings, his largest to date. The score also features a cimbalom, which is used to characterise Alma, and is supposed to allude to her presumed origin from an Eastern European country. The album was mixed and mastered at Abbey Road Studios. Ultimately, the soundtrack is featured prominently in the film, with nearly 90 minutes of music appearing during the film's 130-minute runtime. The film also features music selected by Anderson, namely classical pieces by Claude Debussy, Franz Schubert, Johannes Brahms, Gabriel Fauré and Hector Berlioz.

Release and promotion 
On 1 February 2017, Focus Features officially announced that Greenwood was scoring Anderson's upcoming film. On 26 October 2017, Greenwood shared the sheet music for the film's title theme. The album details were announced on 21 December 2017, and "House of Woodcock" was released the same day. The album was released digitally on 12 January 2018, followed by a CD release on 9 February 2018 and a vinyl LP release on 21 April 2018 (Record Store Day).

The DVD and Blu-ray releases of Phantom Thread included early demos of Greenwood's score.

The score was first performed on 31 January 2018 by the London Contemporary Orchestra during the film's preview screening at the Royal Festival Hall in London. Anderson and Greenwood were in attendance and were interviewed by film critic Mark Kermode. On 24 and 25 February 2018, the score was performed by the Wordless Music Orchestra and the London Contemporary Orchestra at the Brooklyn Academy of Music's Howard Gilman Opera House in Brooklyn, New York. On 2 March 2018, the score was again performed by the Wordless Music Orchestra and the London Contemporary Orchestra at The Theatre at Ace Hotel in Los Angeles, California, with Greenwood and Anderson in attendance.

Critical reception 

Phantom Thread has a score of 86 out of 100 on Metacritic, indicating "universal acclaim," based on 9 reviews. Andrew Male of Mojo gave the soundtrack a perfect score, calling it "an album that goes far beyond emulation or pastiche to capture the emotional heart of a strange and elusive film". Stephen Thomas Erlewine of AllMusic called Greenwood's score "rich and gorgeous, elegant because of its exacting nature, an aesthetic that suits the film to a T." Michael Bonner of Uncut gave the score an 8 out of 10 rating, writing that it complemented the film's 1950s London setting "with its own opulent old-world beauty." Charles Steinberg of Under the Radar praised the score's ability to "accompany the precise tone of every scene", "rising and falling with all of its subtleties and secrets" and concluded in saying that Greenwood "now feels essential" as a composer. Winston Cook-Wilson of Spin wrote, "Greenwood's abilities have never served one of Anderson's films better, or proved so integral to its power." Richard Driver of PopMatters praised the album's sequencing and called it Greenwood's "strongest developed yet, delivering massive impact for the film". James Oldham of Q called it "uniformly deft, sumptuous and moving."

Kevin Lozano of Pitchfork praised Greenwood's ambition and the score's "subtler" moments like "Never Cursed", but lamented that the score's "sumptuousness can be overbearing" and lacking in its sense of restraint. Zack Ruskin of Consequence of Sound praised Greenwood's orchestration for embodying the demeanour of Reynolds Woodcock, but criticised the score's tendency to "spill over and drown the sparse passages of unease that serve as Phantom Threads emotional center."

Lists

Accolades

Track listing

Credits and personnel 
Credits adapted from the album's liner notes.

Musicians 
 Jonny Greenwood – composition , orchestrations , piano 
 Hugh Brunt – additional orchestration 
 Robert Ziegler – conductor , additional orchestration 
 Robert Ames – conductor 
 Katherine Tinker – piano , celeste 
 Daniel Pioro – violin , solo violin arrangement 
 Royal Philharmonic Orchestra – performance 
 London Contemporary Orchestra – performance 
 Jonathan Morton – violin 
 Charlotte Bonneton – viola 
 Oliver Coates – cello 
 Eleanor Turner – harp

Technical 
 Graeme Stewart – production , recording , mixing 
 John Barrett – mixing 
 Nick Wollage – recording 
 Fiona Cruickshank – recording 
 Rob Brinkmann – recording assistant 
 Ashley Andrew-Jones – recording assistant 
 Christian Wright – mastering

Design 
 Laura Hynd – photography
 Shin Katan – album artwork
 Dustin Stanton – design

In popular culture 
 "House of Woodcock" was chosen by figure skater Yuna Kim and used in her act at All That Skate 2018.

References 

Jonny Greenwood albums
2018 soundtrack albums
Nonesuch Records soundtracks
Instrumental soundtracks
Drama film soundtracks
Classical music soundtracks
Albums recorded at RAK Studios
Albums recorded at AIR Studios